The Carp may refer to:

 WGNW, a radio station (99.9 FM) licensed to Cornell, Wisconsin, United States
 The Carp (opera), a one-act comic opera with a libretto by Frank Desprez and music by Alfred Cellier
 The Carp (Band), a post-grunge folk influenced rock band from Wilmington, North Carolina. Formed by J.J Storniolo and Gary Miller.

See also
 Carp (disambiguation)